Akropol (aka Acropole) is a 1995 musical film by Alco Films (with  F.F. Film House Ltd, Greek Film Centre and ET 1). It was directed by Pantelis Voulgaris, and was filmed wholly in Sofia, Bulgaria.

Cast
Lefteris Voyatzis - Lakis Loizos
Stavros Paravas - Antonis Seferiadis, o Prigipas
Konstantinos Tzoumas - Platon
Themis Bazaka - Rena
Sotiria Leonardou
Antzela Gerekou - Zozo
Andigoni Alikakou
Manos Vakousis - Foteinias
Yannis Sampsiaris
Eirini Inglesi
Olga Damani - Marika
Popi Papadaki
Despo Diamantidou - Seferiadou, Antonis's mother

Soundtrack
This list only contains some of the songs featured in Akropol.
 "Kleise ta matia sou"
 Written by Nikos Portokaloglou
 Performed by Nikos Portokaloglou & Melina Kana
 "Maharagias"
 Written by Nikos Portokaloglou
 Performed by Melina Kana

External links

Bulgarian musical films
1995 films
1990s musical films
Films shot in Bulgaria
Films directed by Pantelis Voulgaris
Greek musical films
German musical films
Italian musical films
1990s German films